Echinopelta is a genus of sea snails, marine gastropod mollusks in the family Peltospiridae.

Species
Species within the genus Echinopelta include:

 Echinopelta fistulosa McLean, 1989

References

Peltospiridae
Monotypic gastropod genera